Saint-Léon-de-Standon is a parish municipality of about 1,100 people in the Bellechasse Regional County Municipality in the Chaudière-Appalaches region of Quebec. The Etchemin River goes through the municipality.

Demographics 

See also
St. Leon (disambiguation)

References

Parish municipalities in Quebec
Incorporated places in Chaudière-Appalaches